Saint-Évarzec is a commune in the Finistère department of Brittany in north-western France.

Population
Inhabitants of Saint-Évarzec are called in French Varzécois or Saint-Évarzecois.

Breton language
The municipality launched a linguistic plan through Ya d'ar brezhoneg on September 26, 2008.

See also
Communes of the Finistère department

References

External links

Official website 

Mayors of Finistère Association 

Communes of Finistère